Aulacopleura is a genus of proetid trilobite that lived from the Middle Ordovician to the Middle Devonian. Some authors may classify this group as subgenus Otarion (Aulacopleura).
The cephalon is semicircular or semielliptical, with border and preglabellar field. The glabella is short, with or without defined eye ridges connecting it with eyes of variable size. Spines at the rear outer corners of the cephalon (or genal spines) are present, typically reaching back to the 2nd to 4th thorax segment. The 'palate' (or hypostome) is not connected to the dorsal shield of the cephalon (or natant). The cephalon is pitted, or has small tubercles. The thorax has up to 22 segments. The pleural ends are usually rounded. The pygidium is small (micropygous), with an even margin. A. koninckii had a modern type of compound eye.

Taxonomy 
Barrande described Arethusa koninckii in 1846. However, Arethusa was occupied since it was used by De Montfort in 1808 for a foram protist. Barrande tried to correct this by proposing Arethusina as a replacement, but by that time that Hawle and Corda had already suggested Aulacopleura in 1847, which is thus the senior available name.

Distribution 
 A. andersoni Adrian & Chatterton, 1995 - from the Lower Silurian of Canada (Late Telychian, Upper Whittaker Formation, Mackenzie Mountains)

 A. koninckii is known from the Middle Silurian of the Czech Republic (Wenlockian, Liten Formation, Bohemia).

 A. krizi Snajdr, 1975 - Lower Silurian Bohemia (Želkovice formation, Beroun region, Central Bohemia)

 A. letmathensis has been found in the Middle Devonian of Germany (Givetian).

 A. pogsoni was collected from Lower Silurian of Australia (late Llandovery, upper Cotton Formation, near Forbes, New South Wales).

 A. wulongensis occurs in the Lower Silurian of China (Llandovery, Sichuan).)

See also
 List of trilobites
 Trilobite Terminology

References

Sources 
 Trilobite info (Sam Gon III)

Proetida genera
Ordovician trilobites
Silurian trilobites of Europe
Devonian trilobites of Europe
Fossils of China
Fossils of the Czech Republic
Fossils of Germany
Trilobites of Australia
Silurian trilobites of Asia
Silurian trilobites of Oceania
Dapingian first appearances
Middle Devonian genus extinctions
Paleozoic life of the Northwest Territories
Paleozoic life of Nunavut